Video Girl Ai, known in Japan as simply , is a Japanese manga series written and illustrated by Masakazu Katsura. It was serialized in Shueisha's Weekly Shōnen Jump from December 1989 to April 1992. It was followed by a short sequel entitled Video Girl Len, published between April and July 1992. The manga was compiled into fifteen tankōbon volumes by Shueisha published between July 1990 and March 1993.

A live-action film of Video Girl Ai was released in 1991. The series was also adapted into a six-episode OVA produced by IG Tatsunoko (now Production I.G.). The series was released in 1992 by Jump Video. It roughly covers most of the material found in the first three volumes of the manga. In 2018 a live-action television drama called Den'ei Shōjo ~Video Girl Ai 2018~ ran on TV Tokyo.

In North America, the manga and the OVA have been licensed for English-language release by Viz Media. It was formerly published in the anthology Animerica Extra by Viz.

As of 2018, the manga has over 14 million copies in print.

Plot
The story starts when Yota Moteuchi finds out that the girl he likes, Moemi Hayakawa, is in love with his best friend, Takashi Niimai. Disappointed by this fact, he decides to rent a video from a mysterious video store that appeared in front of him on his way home. The video store was called "Gokuraku" ("Paradise"). The unique thing about this video store was that the videos in the store contained "video girls", girls which literally come to life and out of the user's television when the video tape is played to cheer the renter up. Not knowing about the video girls, Yota chooses to rent the video 'I'll Cheer You Up!', starring Ai Amano. Ai comes to life with the purpose to brighten up Yota's life and encourage him to pursue his love.

However, Yota plays the video on a broken video recorder, which causes Ai to come out "broken"; among other effects she has the ability to feel emotions. This additional feature of Ai causes her to eventually fall in love with Yota; a feeling which, after giving up on Moemi, Yota begins to return. However, a mysterious man related to Gokuraku known as Rolex enters the story and tries to recall Ai as she is faulty, and the fact that Ai's tape is nearing the end of its playing time makes matters even worse.

From this point on, the story changes focus slightly and concentrates on Yota and Ai attempting to overcome the difficulties presented by Gokuraku. Various other complications come into the story; for example Yota's continuing love for Moemi, and his relationship with a new character, Nobuko Nizaki.

Initially, Ai spends some of her time teasing Yota mercilessly in various sexual manners i.e. pretending to initiate intercourse, or joining Yota "innocently" in the bath "to help him wash". Yota's resulting embarrassment and attempt to extricate himself from the situation results, as always, in some slapstick humor and more resulting sexual tension.

Characters

Portrayed by: Kaori Sakagami (1991 film), Nanase Nishino (2018 TV drama)
Beautiful, full of boundless energy. Hard to say what she is really like, versus what she was intended to be. Video girls are generally supposed to be comforting, nubile, excellent cooks and socially graceful, but the malfunction of Yota's VCR has made her tomboyish, at times rude, prone to violence, a terrible cook (actually, she learns to cook all by herself), but full of heart and able to feel human emotion. Her chest endowment has also shrunk considerably due to said VCR malfunction.

Portrayed by: Ken Osawa (1991 film), Shigeyuki Totsugi (2018 TV drama)
Yota is the stereotypical loser, unable to declare his feelings to his unrequited love, Moemi, socially awkward, with a tendency to get nervous and clumsy around women. However, he is known to be also very caring, kind, and helpful to those he is close to.

Portrayed by: Hiromi Hamaguchi (1991 film)
An attractive girl, though almost hopelessly moon-eyed over Takashi, who is too popular to really appreciate Moemi's affectations.

Portrayed by: Naoki Hosaka (1991 film)
The typical "tall, dark and handsome" popular guy. He is one of Yota's best friends, and rejects Moemi's advances because he knows Yota's feelings for her.

A girl, one year behind Yota, who developed a crush on him in art class two years earlier and now, with Moemi and Ai temporarily sidelined, can pursue romantic ties with Yota. She first appears midway through volume 3 and only appears in the manga.

A girl, an orphan and a runaway, who had played with Yota in kindergarten. Her family then moved away. Her theme is misfortune. Her attribute is a hand extended to help one up. She first appears in volume 6 and only appears in the manga. She seems to have a weak heart. Later on in the series she dies in the hospital, and becomes Ai's role model in love.

Len story characters
 
 Star of Let's Fall in Love. A new and untested video girl. She was created by the nameless "Old Man" who once worked in the Gokuraku store. Unlike Ai and the original Video Girls, she is allowed to feel emotions of her own.

 Hiromu Taguchi and Toshiki Karukawa
 The boys who rent the tape. Hiromu is the center character of this new story arc, and is pretty much as shy as Yota used to be. He has a keen interest in Ayumi, but there are some problems in their relationship because of his shyness and because of the bad reputation she has. Later, they engage, but Hiromu becomes too happy to pay attention to Ayumi, and they break up temporarily until he can "find her again" in his memories. Toshiki, on the other hand, is more emotionally expressive and prone to teenage-typical reactions, like spying on Len (which makes her angry).

 
 The girl Hiromu wants to love. However, their relationship is made difficult because of a rumor spread out by her ex-boyfriend, which gave her a bad reputation in her school and beyond (Hiromu and Ayumi attend different schools). Len then devised a plan to re-approach them, just to make Ayumi see who she was dealing with all along. She breaks up with her ex-boyfriend for good and starts dating Hiromu.

 
 Eight years older than he was at the end of Video Girl Ai, Yota now teaches at an art school in the afternoon, which Hiromu and Ayumi attend. He is Hiromu's mentor and they talk often about Len. Yota tells Ayumi that Len went through the same experiences that she is going through. He does mention at one point in the series that Ai is doing well.

Media

Manga
Video Girl Ai is written and illustrated by Masakazu Katsura. The manga was serialized in Weekly Shōnen Jump from December 4, 1989, to April 20, 1992. It was followed by Video Girl Len, which was serialized from April 27 to July 20, 1992. Shueisha compiled the 131 individual chapters into fifteen tankōbon volumes published between July 1990 and March 1993. Shueisha re-published the series into nine bunkoban volumes between January and May 2003.

In North America, Viz Media announced the license of the manga in August 1998. It was first published in the anthology Animerica Extra by Viz until the cancelation of the magazine in December 2004. The manga was originally released in a left to right edition; this version was compiled into seven volumes published between January 2000 and January 2004. The complete series was released in a second edition of all fifteen volumes in the original right to left orientation between May 2004 and April 2006.

List of volumes

Live-action film
A live-action film of Video Girl Ai was released on June 29, 1991.

Original video animation
Video Girl Ai was adapted into a six-episode OVA produced by IG Tatsunoko (now Production I.G.). The series was released in 1992 by Jump Video. It roughly covers most of the material found in the first three volumes of the manga.

In North America, Viz Video released the OVA on VHS in 1999 and on DVD in December 2001.

Drama
In 2018 a live-action television drama called Den'ei Shōjo ~Video Girl Ai 2018~ ran on TV Tokyo. The series is set 25 years after the original manga and the main character is the nephew of Yota Moteuchi. TV Tokyo continued the live-action adaptation with a second series Den'ei Shōjo ~Video Girl Mai 2019~ focusing on the character Mai, played by Mizuki Yamashita.

Reception
As of 2018, the manga has over 14 million copies in print.

Notes

References

External links

 

1989 manga
1992 anime OVAs
1993 Japanese novels
2018 Japanese television series debuts
Light novels
Masakazu Katsura
Production I.G
Romantic comedy anime and manga
Science fiction anime and manga
Shōnen manga
Viz Media anime
Viz Media manga
TV Tokyo original programming